PokerTek was a company that developed the PokerPro electronic poker table and Heads-Up Challenge video game, as well as related software applications.

The PokerPro table were introduced at casinos in dozens of countries as well as cruise ships. Introduction of PokerPro tables at Trump Plaza raised concerns among dealers about their job security.

The Heads-Up Challenge video game was co-branded with the World Series of Poker.

Pokertek was the exclusive provider of automated poker tables for Harrah's Entertainment and Ameristar Casinos. 

Aristocrat Leisure was Pokertek's exclusive provider for countries outside of the United States and Canada.

In 2014, PokerTek was sold to Multimedia Games (of Austin, Texas) for $13,500,000.

References

Gambling companies established in 2003
Gambling companies disestablished in 2014
Video game companies established in 2003
Video game companies disestablished in 2014
Defunct companies based in North Carolina
Defunct poker companies
Defunct gambling companies
Defunct video game companies of the United States
Mecklenburg County, North Carolina
2014 mergers and acquisitions